Colossae was an ancient city of Phrygia in Asia Minor, and one of the most celebrated cities of southern Anatolia (modern Turkey). The Epistle to the Colossians, an early Christian text which identifies its author as Paul the Apostle, is addressed to the church in Colossae.  A significant city from the 5th century BC onwards, it had dwindled in importance by the time of Paul, but was notable for the existence of its local angel cult.  It was part of the Roman – and then Byzantine – province of Phrygia Pacatiana, before being destroyed in 1192/3 and its population relocating to nearby Chonae (Chonai, modern-day Honaz).

Location and geography
Colossae was located in Phrygia, in Asia Minor. At Colossae, Herodotus describes how, "the river Lycos falls into an opening of the earth and disappears from view, and then after an interval of about five furlongs it comes up to view again, and this river also flows into the Maiander." Despite a treacherously ambiguous cartography and history, Colossae has been clearly distinguished in modern research from nearby Chonai, now called Honaz, with what remains of the buried ruins of Colossae ("the mound")  lying  to the north of Honaz.

Origin and etymology of place name

The medieval poet Manuel Philes, incorrectly, imagined that the name "Colossae" was connected to the Colossus of Rhodes. More recently, in an interpretation which ties Colossae to an Indo-European root that happens to be shared with the word kolossos, Jean-Pierre Vernant has connected the name to the idea of setting up a sacred space or shrine. Another proposal relates the name to the Greek kolazo, "to punish". Others believe the name derives from the manufacture of its famous dyed wool, or colossinus.

History

Before the Pauline period

The first mention of the city may be in a 17th-century BC Hittite inscription, which speaks of a city called Huwalušija, which some archeologists believe is a reference to early Colossae. The 5th-century geographer Herodotus first mentions Colossae by name and as a "great city in Phrygia", which accommodates the Persian king Xerxes I while en route to wage war against the Greeks in the Greco-Persian Wars– showing the city had already reached a certain level of wealth and size by this time. 
Writing in the 5th century BC, Xenophon refers to Colossae as "a populous city, wealthy and of considerable magnitude".  It was famous for its wool trade.  Strabo notes that the city drew great revenue from the flocks, and that the wool of Colossae gave its name to colour colossinus.

In 396 BC, Colossae was the site of the execution of the rebellious Persian satrap Tissaphernes, who was lured there and slain by an agent of the party of Cyrus the Younger.

Pauline period

Although during the Hellenistic period, the town was of some mercantile importance, by the 1st century it had dwindled greatly in size and significance.  Paul's letter to the Colossians points to the existence of an early Christian community. The town was known for its fusion of religious influences (syncretism), which included Jewish, Gnostic, and pagan influences that, in the first century AD, were described as an angel-cult. This unorthodox cult venerated the archangel Michael, who is said to have caused a curative spring to gush from a fissure in the earth.
The worship of angels showed analogies with the cult of pre-Christian pagan deities like Zeus. Saint Theodoret of Cyrrhus told about their surviving in Phrygia during the fourth century.

The canonical biblical text Epistle to the Colossians is addressed to the Christian community in Colossae. The epistle has traditionally been attributed to Paul the Apostle due to its autobiographical salutation and style, but some modern critical scholars now believe it to be written by another author some time after Paul's death. It is believed that one aim of the letter was to address the challenges that the Colossian community faced in its context of the syncretistic Gnostic religions that were developing in Asia Minor.

According to the Epistle to the Colossians, Epaphras seems to have been a person of some importance in the Christian community in Colossae, and tradition presents him as its first bishop. The epistle also seems to imply that Paul had never visited the city, because it only speaks of him having "heard" of the Colossians' faith, and in the Epistle to Philemon Paul tells Philemon of his hope to visit Colossae upon being freed from prison. Tradition also gives Philemon as the second bishop of the see.

The city was decimated by an earthquake in the 60s AD, and was rebuilt independent of the support of Rome.

The Apostolic Constitutions list Philemon as a bishop of Colossae. On the other hand, the Catholic Encyclopedia considers Philemon doubtful.

The first historically documented bishop is Epiphanius, who was not personally at the Council of Chalcedon, but whose metropolitan bishop Nunechius of Laodicea, the capital of the Roman province of Phrygia Pacatiana, signed the acts on his behalf.

Byzantine period and decline

The city's fame and renowned status continued into the Byzantine period, and in 858, it was distinguished as a Metropolitan See. The Byzantines also built the church of St. Michael in the vicinity of Colossae, one of the largest church buildings in the Middle East. Nevertheless, sources suggest that the town may have decreased in size or may even been completely abandoned due to Arab invasions in the seventh and eighth centuries, forcing the population to flee to resettle in the nearby city of Chonai (modern day Honaz).

Colossae's famous church was destroyed in 1192/3 during the Byzantine civil wars.  It was a suffragan diocese of Laodicea in Phyrigia Pacatiane but was replaced in the Byzantine period by the Chonae settlement on higher ground

Modern study and archeology

As of 2019, Colossae has never been excavated, as most archeological attention has been focused on nearby Laodicea and Hierapolis, though plans are reported for an Australian-led expedition to the site. On the eastern slope there sits a theater which probably seated around 5,000 people, suggesting a total population of 25,000–30,000 people. The theater was probably built during the Roman period, and may be near an agora that abuts the cardo maximus, or the city's main north-south road. Ceramic finds around the theater confirm the city's early occupation in the third and second millennia BC. Northeast of the tell, and most likely outside the city walls, a necropolis displays Hellenistic tombs with two main styles of burial: one with an antecedent room connected to an inner chamber, and tumuli, or underground chambers accessed by stairs leading to the entrance. Outside the tell, there are also remains of sections of columns that may have marked a processional way, or the cardo. Today, the remains of one column marks the location where locals believe a church once stood, possibly that of St. Michael. Near the Lycus River, there is evidence that water channels had been cut out of the rock with a complex of pipes and sluice gates to divert water for bathing and for agricultural and industrial purposes.

Modern legacy
The holiness and healing properties associated with the waters of Colossae during the Byzantine era continue to this day, particularly at a pool fed by the Lycus River at the Göz picnic grounds west of Colossae at the foot of Mt. Cadmus. Locals consider the water to be therapeutic.

See also
 List of ancient Greek cities

Notes and references

Further reading 
 
 
 Bennett, Andrew Lloyd. "Archaeology From Art: Investigating Colossae and the Miracle of the Archangel Michael at Kona." Near East Archaeological Society Bulletin 50 (2005):15–26.

External links
Map and pictures of ruins

 
1192 disestablishments
1193 disestablishments
12th-century disestablishments in the Byzantine Empire
Populated places disestablished in the 12th century
Roman towns and cities in Turkey
Pauline churches
New Testament cities
Former populated places in Turkey
Populated places in Phrygia
Populated places of the Byzantine Empire
Catholic titular sees in Asia
History of Denizli Province
Honaz District